Scaphiopus holbrookii, commonly known as the eastern spadefoot, is a species of American spadefoot toad (family Scaphiopodidae) endemic to North America.

Geographic range
It is found in the southeastern United States, except for mountainous areas, and is also found northward along the Atlantic coast, through the Mid-Atlantic states, into southern New England, including eastern Massachusetts. It is found in inland states such as Pennsylvania and New York, but only as far westward as the Appalachian Mountains, and the Hudson River Valley in New York.

Description

It is brownish in color, with two yellowish stripes on its back. These stripes, which begin on the upper eyelids, may diverge or converge, resulting in a pattern resembling a lyre or an hourglass. Some specimens may be very dark, with less distinct markings. The skin is normally smoother and moister than other toads. The eastern spadefoot belongs in one of only four groups of burrowing terrestrial anurans. It has one spur on each of its back feet for burrowing. The spur is generally three times longer than the other toes. A similar species is Hurter's spadefoot toad, which was once considered a subspecies of S. holbrookii.

Behavior
Scaphiopus holbrookii spends almost all of its life deep underground; coming out only to breed, and sometimes eat. It remains in a type of hibernation almost all its life. It burrows in a spiral, preferring sandy soils.

Research has looked into the habitat selection of the species, and has found that it tends to hover around upland areas. It has shown preference for being close to deciduous shrub edges, low-growing pitch pine branches, and reindeer lichen. This environment provides an easy place to burrow land, with dense prey biomass, and protection from predators.

Unlike some other spadefoot toad species, such as Spea multiplicata (the Mexican or desert spadefoot) or Spea bombifrons (the plains spadefoot toad), Scaphiopus holbrookii never naturally develop cannibal tadpoles through phenotypic plasticity. Researchers at the University of North Carolina at Chapel Hill believe this is because the eastern spadefoot is most representative of the first spadefoot toads to evolve.

One study used Passive Integrated Transponders (PIT tags) to monitor their emergence of burrows. The study found that S. holbrookii emerge about 43% of the nights they were monitored. They are much more likely to emerge if they had emerged the night prior as well. They also tended to emerge more frequently from their burrows on nights that were warmer and more humid, or the night after/during rain. Other than the emergence after rain and during breeding season, these animals do not have a specific pattern to their burrow emergence; the movements seem to be very random.

Feeding habits
Although Scaphiopus holbrookii is both diurnal and nocturnal, most foraging for food sources, consisting of small invertebrates such as termites, insects, arachnids, worms, is completed during the day. Some species will completely leave to burrow in search of prey; however, a common tactic for the eastern spadefoot is to simply sit at the opening of the burrow and wait for prey to pass by.

Reproduction 
S. holbrookii requires fish-free ephemeral ponds for breeding but occupies other habitats such as longleaf pine and wiregrass ecosystems when not breeding. Eastern spadefoot toads are explosive breeders during sufficient rainfall and eggs are usually attached to submerged vegetation. Due to the explosive breeding once eggs hatch often food becomes limited from the large populations of tadpoles. S. holbrookii tadpoles are known to be omnivorous. In the event of food shortages some larva adapt aggressive feeding habits consuming large animal prey including other S. holbrookii tadpoles. These cannibalistic morphs develop a heightened rate and become much larger tadpoles in comparison to the non-cannibal morphs.

Conservation status
While not listed as an endangered species by the U.S. federal government, S. holbrookii is considered "threatened" in Massachusetts. In that state and in 13 others, it is listed as a "Species of Greatest Conservation Need".

Etymology
The epithet, holbrookii, is in honor of John Edwards Holbrook, American herpetologist.

References

External links
 Outdoor Alabama - Eastern Spadefoot

holbrookii
Endemic fauna of the United States
Spadefoot, Eastern
Splayfoot, Eastern
Amphibians described in 1835